Malibu Comics Entertainment, Inc. (also known as Malibu Graphics) was an American comic book publisher active in the late 1980s and early 1990s, best known for its Ultraverse line of superhero titles. Notable titles published by Malibu included The Men in Black, Ultraforce, and Night Man.

The company's headquarters was in Calabasas, California. Malibu was initially publisher of record for Image Comics from 1992 to 1993. The company's other imprints included Adventure, Aircel and Eternity. Malibu also owned a small software development company that designed video games in the early to mid-1990s called Malibu Interactive.

History

Origins 
Malibu Comics was launched in 1986 by Dave Olbrich and Tom Mason with the private financing of Scott Mitchell Rosenberg, who was operating a comic book distribution company (Sunrise Distribution) at the time. Unbeknownst to most people in the industry, Rosenberg was also financing a number of other small comics publishers: Eternity Comics, Amazing Comics, Wonder Color Comics, and Imperial Comics.

Malibu's output began modestly, with creator-owned black-and-white titles; its first title was David Lawrence and Ron Lim's Ex-Mutants.

Mergers/acquisitions of other publishers 
In 1987, after Rosenberg's behind-the-scenes roles were revealed, he discontinued most of the other small publishers, merging some with Malibu and retaining Eternity Comics as a Malibu brand. At this point, Chris Ulm joined Malibu as editor-in-chief.

In 1988, Malibu effectively acquired the Canadian publisher Aircel Comics as an imprint, and in 1989 it acquired Adventure Publications. 

From that point forward, the Malibu brand was used for superhero titles; while Eternity was used for the magazine line and also for anime-inspired titles like Robotech; Adventure was used for Malibu's licensed titles, such as Planet of the Apes and Alien Nation; and Aircel was used for Barry Blair's comics and Malibu's adult line. 

In 1998, the company also acquired the character Shuriken from his creator Reggie Byers (a character that was self-published from 1985–1988 by Victory Productions). Shuriken was published in three limited series and two one-shots by Malibu; later the character was introduced in the Ultraverse imprint.

1989-1992 
By this time, the company had made a name for itself by publishing a combination of new series and licensed properties such as the classic characters Tarzan and Sherlock Holmes, and popular television, film, and video game tie-ins. Later, after a legal battle with the creators, Malibu created a shared universe called Shattered Earth.

In 1992, heroes from Centaur Publications (a Golden Age publisher whose properties fell into the public domain) were revived in the form of the Protectors, consisting of Airman, Amazing-Man, Aura, Arc, Arrow, Ferret, Man of War and Mighty Man, among others. Several of these characters had short-lived spin-off titles of their own. The Centaur heroes and other characters from Adventure (Miss Fury and Rocket Ranger), and Eternity (Dinosaurs for Hire, Ex-Mutants) plus Dead Clown and Widowmaker, were put together in one Universe to form the Genesis line. This line, however, had a short lifespan.

The Bravura imprint was then launched for the creator-owned and licensed titles.

Image Comics' publisher of record 
In early 1992, Malibu served as publisher of record for the first comics from Image Comics, giving the upstart creator-run publisher access to the distribution channels. This move led to Malibu obtaining almost ten per cent of the American comics market share, temporarily moving ahead of industry giant DC Comics. 

By the beginning of 1993, Image's financial situation was secure enough to publish its titles independently, and it left Malibu.

Malibu Interactive and Ultraverse 
In late 1992, seeking to capitalize on the growing video game market, Malibu merged with video game developer Acme Interactive to form Malibu Interactive.

The Ultraverse line was launched in June 1993 during the "boom" of the early 1990s, roughly concurrent with the debut of publishers such as Image and Valiant, and new superhero lines from DC and Dark Horse (Milestone and Comics' Greatest World, respectively). The line was in part intended to fill the gap left by Image's independence. 

Establishing itself as the first company as the first to use digital coloring for all its titles, Malibu boasted improved production values over traditional comics, including higher-quality paper, and a roster of talented and respected writers and artists. Emphasizing the tight continuity between the various series in the Ultraverse line, Malibu made extensive use of crossovers, in which a story that began in one series would be continued in the next-shipping issue of another series.  Various promotions for special editions or limited-print stories followed. The Ultraverse line came to dominate Malibu's catalog.

Malibu launched additionally the Rock-It Comix imprint for rock band comics in early 1994. Malibu worked with the Gold Mountain Entertainment management firm in dealing with the musicians, while International Strategic Marketing was distributing the line to comic book shops, music outlets, and newsstands.

Acquisition by Marvel Comics 
As sales declined industry-wide in the mid-1990s, Malibu canceled lower-selling series. But their biggest problem was their game division, started in an attempt to break into the video game market, which cost them more than $200,000 a month. Nonetheless, the company's assets were still seen as attractive enough to garner interest from DC Comics in the spring of 1994. In addition, Rosenberg and Malibu signed with the William Morris Agency. 

Because Malibu had sufficient market share that an acquisition from DC would make the latter surpass Marvel's market share, Marvel decided to purchase Malibu themselves to prevent this from happening: on November 3, 1994, Malibu was purchased by Marvel Comics. To slow down rumors that Ultraverse titles would be canceled as soon as the deal closed, Malibu claimed that Marvel wanted them because of their digital coloring system.

In the middle of the next year, 1995, Malibu standard-bearers Mason and Ulm left the company.

Marvel did eventually cancel the entire Ultraverse line, but (during the Black September event) re-launched a handful of the more popular titles as well as a number of crossovers with Marvel characters. The "volume 2" series each started with "#∞ (infinity)" issues and were canceled a short time later. Within the Marvel Comics multiverse, the Genesis Universe is designated as Earth-1136 and the Ultraverse as Earth-93060.

Very little Malibu content was published after 1996.

Potential Ultraverse revival 
In June 2005, when asked by Newsarama whether Marvel had any plans to revive the Ultraverse, Marvel editor-in-chief Joe Quesada replied that:

In May 2012, Steve Englehart suggested in a podcast interview that the reason Marvel will not presently publish the Ultraverse characters is because five percent of the profits from those books would have to go to the Malibu creators that are still alive. Marvel Editor Tom Brevoort later denied that the five percent was what was holding Marvel back, but was unable to give a real explanation due to a non-disclosure agreement.

It has been speculated that Scott Mitchell Rosenberg's ongoing producer deal for all Malibu properties (and his alleged personal troubles) is another possible factor.

Titles
Some of Malibu's titles included:

Genesis
This line made use of many Centaur heroes plus characters previously published by Adventure, Aircel and Eternity:

Airman #1 (January 1993)
Arrow #1 (October 1992)
Dead Clown #1–3 (October 1993 – February 1994)
Dinosaurs for Hire (volume 2) #1–12 (February 1993 – February 1994)
Ex-Mutants (volume 2) #1–18 (November 1992 – April 1994)
The Ferret (volume 1) #1 (September 1982)
The Ferret (volume 2) #1–10 (May 1993 – March 1994)
Genesis #0 (October 1993)
Gravestone #1–7 (1993 – February 1994)
The Malibu Sun #24 (April 1993, the issue contained a four-page story featuring Widowmaker)
Man of War #1–8 (April 1993 – February 1994)
Protectors #1–20 (September 1992 – May 1994)
Protectors Handbook #1 (November 1992)

Ultraverse
The All-New Exiles #1–11 (October 1995 – August 1996)
Black September (May 1995 – October 1995, universe-changing event)
Break-Thru #1–2 (December 1993 – January 1994, crossover mini-series)
Codename: Firearm #0–5 (June–August 1995)
Eliminator #0–3 (April–July 1995)
Elven #0–4 (October 1994 – May 1995)
Exiles #1–4 (August–November 1993)
Firearm #1–18 + 0 (September 1993 – February 1995)
Freex #1–18 (July 1993 – February 1995)
Godwheel #0–3 (January–February 1995, crossover mini-series)
Hardcase #1–26 (June 1993 – August 1995)
Hostile Takeover (September 1994, ashcan)
Lord Pumpkin #0 (October 1994, one shot)
Lord Pumpkin/Necro-Mantra #1–4 (April–July 1995, mini-series)
Mantra #1–24 (July 1993 – August 1995)
The Night Man 1–23 (October 1993 – August 1995)
Prime #1–26 (June 1993 – August 1995)
Prototype #1–18 + 0 (August 1993 – February 1995)
Rafferty #1 (November 1994, ashcan)
Ripfire #0 (January 1995, one shot)
Rune #0–9 (January 1994 – April 1995)
Siren #1–3 (October–December 1995)
Sludge #1–12 (October 1993 – December 1994)
Solitaire #1–12 (November 1993 – December 1994)
The Solution #1–17 + 0 (September 1993 – February 1995)
The Strangers #1–24 (June 1993 – May 1995)
Ultraforce #1–10 + 0 (August 1994 – July 1995)
Ultraverse Premiere #0 (November 1993, a rotating backup series)
Ultraverse Double Feature #1 (January 1995, one-shot)
Ultraverse Origins #1 (January 1994, one-shot)
Warstrike #1–7 (May–November 1994)
Wrath #1–9 (January–December 1994)
Year Zero: The Death of the Squad #1–4 (April–July 1995, mini-series)

Crossovers with Marvel Comics
The All-New Exiles vs. X-Men #0 (October 1995)
Avengers/Ultraforce #1 (October 1995)
Conan vs. Rune #1 (November 1995)
The Night Man/Gambit #1–3 (March–May 1996)
The Night Man vs. Wolverine #0 (August 1995) 
The Phoenix Resurrection (December–March 1996)
Prime vs. The Incredible Hulk #0 (July 1995)
Prime/Captain America #1 (March 1996)
Rune vs. Venom #1 (December 1995)
Rune/Silver Surfer #1 (April 1995, published in a flip book with the other side reading Silver Surfer/Rune)
Ultraforce/Avengers #1 (October 1995)
Ultraforce/Avengers Prelude #1 (July 1995)
Ultraforce/Spider-Man #1A, #1B (January 1996)

Adventure Comics
Alien Nation:
 Alien Nation: The Spartans #1–4 (1990)
 Alien Nation: A Breed Apart #1–4 (November 1990 – March 1991)
 Alien Nation: The Skin Trade #1–4 (March–June 1991)
 Alien Nation: The Firstcomers #1–4 (May–August 1991)
 Alien Nation: The Public Enemy #1–4 (December 1991 – March 1992)
Ape Nation #1–4 (February–June 1991, a crossover featuring elements from Alien Nation and Planet of the Apes)
Demon's Tails #1–4 (January–April 1993)
Dracula: The Suicide Club #1–4 (August–November 1992, original sequel to the Bram Stoker novel Dracula and the Robert Louis Stevenson series The Suicide Club)
H. P. Lovecraft #1–4 (Adaptations of The Lurking Fear, Beyond the Wall of Sleep, The Tomb, and The Alchemist)
Logan's Run #1–6 (June 1990 – April 1991, based on the 1967 novel of the same title)
Logan's World #1–6 (May 1991 – March 1992, based on the 1977 novel of the same title)
Miss Fury – In Full Color! #1–4 (November 1991 – February 1992)
Paranoia #1–6 (November 1991 – August 1992, based on the role-playing game of the same title)
Planet of the Apes:
 Planet of the Apes #1–24 (April 1990 – July 1992)
 Ape City #1–4 (August–November 1990)
 Planet of the Apes Annual #1 (1991)
 Planet of the Apes: Urchak's Folly #1–4 (January–April 1991)
 Terror on the Planet of the Apes #1–4 (June–December 1991, reprint of the Marvel Comics storyline)
 Planet of the Apes: Blood of the Apes #1–4 (November 1991 – February 1991)
 Planet of the Apes: Sins of the Father #1 (March 1992)
 Planet of the Apes: The Forbidden Zone #1–4 (December 1992 – March 1993)
Re-Animator #1–3 (Adaptation of 1985 film Re-Animator)
Rocket Ranger #1–5 (September 1991 – July 1992, based on the Cinemaware computer game)

Aircel Comics
Bodyguard #1–3 (September–November 1990, reprint of Australian title with new material)
Carmilla #1–6 (February–July 1991)
Casanova #1–10 (March–December 1991)
The Cat #1–2 (November–December 1991)
Cat & Mouse #1–18 (March 1990 – September 1991)
Flesh Gordon #1–4 (March–July 1992, based on the 1974 film of the same title)
Full Throttle #1–2 (October–November 1991, reprint of Australian titles Rip Snorter and Raw Tonnage with new material)
Galaxina #1–4 (December 1991 – March 1992, based on the 1980 film of the same title)
The Men in Black:
 The Men in Black #1–3 (January–March 1990)
 The Men in Black Book II #1–3 (May–July 1991)
Samurai #1–23 (January 1986 – October 1987)
Samurai (volume 2) #1–3 (December 1987 – February 1988)
Samurai (volume 3) #1–7 (July 1988 – January 1989)
Scum of the Earth #1–3 (August–October 1991, based on the 1963 film of the same title)
Silver Storm #1–4 (May–August 1990)
The Southern Squadron #1–4 (August–November 1990, reprint of Australian superhero title with new material)
Team Nippon #1–7 (June–December 1989)
Vampyre's Kiss #1–4 (1990)

Eternity Comics
Captain Harlock #1–13 (October 1989 – December 1990)
Cat Claw #1–9 (September 1990 – October 1991)
Charlie Chan #1–6 (March–August 1989)
Cosmic Heroes #1–11 (October 1988–1989)
Demonic Toys #1–4 (January–August 1992, based on the film series of the same title)
Dinosaurs for Hire (volume 1) #1–9 (March 1988 – January 1990)
Dollman #1–2 (1991–1992, based on the 1991 film of the same title)
Dracula #1–4 (December 1989 – March 1990, adaptation of the Bram Stoker novel Dracula)
Dracula: The Lady in the Tomb #1 (January 1991, adaptation of the Bram Stoker short story Dracula's Guest)
Galactic Patrol Lensman #1–5 (July 1990 – November 1990)
Ghosts of Dracula #1–5 (September 1991 – January 1992)
Invaders from Mars #1–3 (March–May 1990, adaptation of the 1953 film Invaders from Mars)
Invaders from Mars #1–3 (June–August 1991, original sequel to the 1953 film Invaders from Mars)
The Mantus Files #1–4 (August–November 1991)
Ninja High School by Ben Dunn (1988–1993) – title inherited from (and then taken back by) Antarctic Press
Plan 9 from Outer Space: Thirty Years Later! #1–3 (January–March 1991)
Puppet Master:
 Puppet Master – In Full Color! #1–4 (November 1990 – May 1991)
 Puppet Master: Children of the Puppet Master #1–2 (August–September 1991)
Robotech
Scimidar #1–4 (June–September 1988) 
The Southern Squadron: The Freedom of Information Act #1–4 (January–April 1991, reprint of Australian superhero title with new material)
Street Heroes 2005 #1–3 (January–March 1989)
Subspecies #1–4 (May–August 1991, based on the 1991 film of the same title)
Trancers: The Adventures of Jack Deth #1–2 (August–September 1991, based on the Trancers film series)
White Devil #1–6 (June–November 1990)

Shattered Earth
Ex-Mutants (volume 1) #1–8 (1986–1987)
Ex-Mutants: The Shattered Earth Chronicles #1–15 (April 1988 – February 1990)
The New Humans #1–15 (December 1987 – August 1989)
Shattered Earth #1–9 (November 1988 – August 1989)
Solo Ex-Mutants #1–6 (January 1988 – January 1989)
Wild Knights #1–10 (March 1988 – June 1989)

Shuriken spin-offs
Blade of Shuriken #1–5 (May 1987 – January 1988)
Hellbender #1 (January 1990)
Shuriken (volume 2) #1–6 (June–November 1991)
Shuriken Team-Up #1 (January 1988)
Shuriken: Cold Steel #1–6 (July–December 1989)

Bravura
Bravura #0
Breed (2 series) by Jim Starlin
Dreadstar by Jim Starlin
Edge by Steven Grant and Gil Kane (unfinished – iBooks released a hardback collection of the complete first series)
The Man Called A-X by Marv Wolfman
Metaphysique by Norm Breyfogle
Nocturnals by Dan Brereton
Power & Glory by Howard Chaykin
Star Slammers by Walter Simonson (unfinished until the series moved to Dark Horse Comics)
Strikeback by Jonathan Peterson, Kevin Maguire and Steve Oliff (unfinished – Image Comics released this series later on and completed it)

Rock-It Comix
Black Sabbath #1 (February 1994)
Lita Ford #1 (December 1993)
Metallica #1 (December 1993)
Ozzy Osbourne #1 (December 1993)
Pantera #1 (August 1994)
Santana #1 (May 1994)
World Domination #1 (December 1993)

Other titles

Bruce Lee #1–6 (July–December 1994)
Mortal Kombat:
 Mortal Kombat: Blood and Thunder (July–November 1994)
 Mortal Kombat: Goro, Prince of Pain #1–3 (September–November 1994)
 Mortal Kombat #0 (December 1994)
 Mortal Kombat: Tournament Edition #1 (December 1994)
 Mortal Kombat: U.S. Special Forces #1–2 (January–February 1995)
 Mortal Kombat: Battlewave #1–6 (February–July 1995)
 Mortal Kombat: Rayden and Kano #1–3 (March–May 1995)
 Mortal Kombat: Baraka #1 (June 1995)
 Mortal Kombat: Kung Lao #1 (July 1995)
 Mortal Kombat: Kitana and Mileena #1 (August 1995)
 Mortal Kombat: Tournament Edition II #1 (August 1995)
Project A-ko #1–4 (March–June 1994)
Raver #1–3 (April–June 1993, created by Star Trek actor Walter Koenig)
Star Blazers #0–11 (March 1995 – May 1997)
 Star Trek:
 Star Trek: Deep Space Nine #1–32 (August 1993 – January 1996)
 Star Trek: Deep Space Nine/The Next Generation #1–2 (October–November 1994, co-published with DC Comics)
Street Fighter #1–3 (September–November 1993)
Tarzan:
 Tarzan the Warrior #1–5 (March–August 1992)
 Tarzan: Love, Lies, and the Lost City #1–3 (August–October 1992)
 Tarzan the Beckoning #1–7 (November 1992 – June 1993)
Terminator 2: Judgment Day:
Terminator 2: Judgment Day: Cybernetic Dawn #1–4 (November 1995 – February 1996)
Terminator 2: Judgment Day: Nuclear Twilight #1–4 (November 1995 – February 1996)
Terminator 2: Judgment Day: Nuclear Twilight/Cybernetic Dawn #0 (April 1996)

Malibu Interactive games

References

Malibu Comics at the Big Comic Book DataBase

External links

Newsarama.com: "Joe Fridays", by Joe Quesada
Comic Book Resources: "Lying in the Gutters", by Rich Johnston
Genesis Universe/Protectors site

 
Marvel Comics imprints
American companies established in 1986
American companies disestablished in 1994
Comic book publishing companies of the United States
Defunct comics and manga publishing companies
Publishing companies established in 1986
Publishing companies disestablished in 1994
Companies based in Calabasas, California
1986 establishments in California
1994 disestablishments in California
1994 mergers and acquisitions